The following is a list of Michigan State Historic Sites in Tuscola County, Michigan. Sites marked with a dagger (†) are also listed on the National Register of Historic Places in Tuscola County, Michigan.


Current listings

See also
 National Register of Historic Places listings in Tuscola County, Michigan

Sources
 Historic Sites Online – Tuscola County. Michigan State Housing Developmental Authority. Accessed June 4, 2011.

References

Tuscola County
State Historic Sites